Mehlbaum may refer to:

 Mehlbaum, Switzerland, a settlement in the municipality of Naters in the Swiss canton of Valais
 Ray Mehlbaum, an American rock drummer